Anne Sjerp Troelstra (10 August 1939 – 7 March 2019) was a professor of pure mathematics and foundations of mathematics at the Institute for Logic, Language and Computation (ILLC) of the University of Amsterdam.

He was a constructivist logician, who was influential in the development of intuitionistic logic With Georg Kreisel, he was a developer of the theory of choice sequences. He wrote one of the first texts on linear logic, and, with Helmut Schwichtenberg, he co-wrote an important book on proof theory.

He became a member of the Royal Netherlands Academy of Arts and Sciences in 1976. Troelstra died on 7 March 2019.

Notes

External links
Homepage of A. S. Troelstra : Dead Link - Archived : Homepage of A. S. Troelstra : Retrieved on 27 June 2018

1939 births
2019 deaths
Dutch mathematicians
Members of the Royal Netherlands Academy of Arts and Sciences
People from De Bilt
University of Amsterdam alumni
Academic staff of the University of Amsterdam
20th-century Dutch people